Eun-hye, also spelled Eun-hae, or Eun-hay, Eun-heh, Un-heh, is a Korean feminine given name. The meaning differs based on the hanja used to write each syllable of the name. There are 30 hanja with the reading "eun" and 23 hanja with the reading "hye" on the South Korean government's official list of hanja which may be used in given names. It also means "favor, grace" in Korean.

People with this name include:

Entertainers
Park Eun-hye (born 1978), South Korean actress
Ivy (singer) (born Park Eun-hye, 1982), South Korean singer
Yoon Eun-hye (born 1984), South Korean actress and singer
Gil Eun-hye (born 1988), South Korean actress

Sportspeople
Bae Eun-hye (born 1982), South Korean judo practitioner
Kim Eun-hye (born 1987), South Korean sport shooter
Yang Eun-hye (born 1987), South Korean weightlifter
Jung Eun-hea (born 1989), South Korean sport shooter

Other
Kim Eun-hye (born 1971), South Korean politician
Lee Eun-hye, alias of Yaeko Taguchi (born 1955), Japanese woman abducted by North Korea, teacher of Kim Hyon-hui
Yoo Eun-hae (born 1962), South Korean politician

See also
List of Korean given names

References

Korean feminine given names